Life Begins at Seventeen is a 1953 West German romance film directed by Paul Martin and starring Sonja Ziemann, Paul Hubschmid and Paul Hörbiger. It was shot at the Tempelhof Studios in West Berlin. The film's sets were designed by the art director Wilhelm Vorwerg.

Cast
 Sonja Ziemann as Madeleine Desughes
 Anne-Marie Blanc as Aline Deshuges
 Paul Hubschmid as Raymond Montandon, Kunstmaler
 Paul Hartmann as Professor Lenoire
 Loni Heuser as Clarisse Peronne
 Paul Hörbiger as Jacques Peronne
 Margarete Haagen as Adelheid
 Heinrich Gretler as Pfarrer
 Marina Ried as Sylvia
 Hilde Körber as Lehrerin
 Stanislav Ledinek as Küster
 Ruth Fischer as Pariser Freundin
 Heinz Lausch as Henry

References

Bibliography 
 Hans-Michael Bock and Tim Bergfelder. The Concise Cinegraph: An Encyclopedia of German Cinema. Berghahn Books, 2009.

External links 
 

1953 films
1950s romance films
German romance films
West German films
1950s German-language films
Films directed by Paul Martin
Films set in France
Films based on Hungarian novels
Films shot at Tempelhof Studios
German black-and-white films
1950s German films